Henrik Kalocsai (28 November 1940 – 22 May 2012) was a Hungarian athlete who specialized in the triple jump and long jump.

He won the gold medal at the 1965 Summer Universiade, the bronze medal at the 1966 European Championships and the silver medal at the 1967 European Indoor Games. He became the Hungarian triple jump champion in 1962, 1963, 1965, 1967, 1968, 1970, 1971 and 1973, rivalling with Drágán Ivanov, Zoltán Cziffra and Gábor Katona.

In the long jump he finished sixth at the 1970 European Indoor Championships. He became Hungarian long jump champion in every year from 1960 to 1971, except for 1964 and 1968 when Béla Margitics won. He also became indoor champion in 1974.

References

1940 births
2012 deaths
Hungarian male long jumpers
Hungarian male triple jumpers
Athletes (track and field) at the 1964 Summer Olympics
Athletes (track and field) at the 1968 Summer Olympics
Olympic athletes of Hungary
European Athletics Championships medalists
Universiade medalists in athletics (track and field)
Universiade gold medalists for Hungary
Athletes from Budapest
Medalists at the 1965 Summer Universiade
20th-century Hungarian people
21st-century Hungarian people